Devil Island is a 128 ha, ice-free island about 2 km long, in the James Ross Island group near the north-eastern tip of the Antarctic Peninsula.  It lies in a small cove 1 km north of Vega Island, east of the Trinity Peninsula. It is characterised by several low hills rising to a maximum height of about 150 m.

Geography 
Devil island is a recent volcano consisting of two basalt volcano necks, surrounded by extensive talus.

Important Bird Area
The site has been identified as an Important Bird Area (IBA) by BirdLife International because it supports a large breeding colony of about 15,000 pairs of Adélie penguins.  Other birds recorded as nesting there include brown skuas and snow petrels.

References

Important Bird Areas of Antarctica
Seabird colonies
Islands of the James Ross Island group
Penguin colonies